Russian Footballer of the Year may refer to:

 Footballer of the Year in Russia (Futbol)
 Footballer of the Year in Russia (Sport-Express)

See also
 Soviet Footballer of the Year